Hamza Ait Allal  is a Moroccan professional footballer who plays as a right-back for Wydad AC.

References

Living people
2001 births
Moroccan footballers
Association football fullbacks
Wydad AC players